The 1922 NYU Violets football team was an American football team that represented New York University as an independent during the 1922 college football season. In their first year under head coach Tom Thorp, the team compiled a 4–5 record. Prior to the start of the season, the Violets trained for ten days at Fort Slocum. In their final day of practice at the Fort, they played against a team of the Second Army Corps to a scoreless tie on September 25.

Schedule

References

NYU
NYU Violets football seasons
NYU Violets football